Press review is a summary of several press articles (usually the press of the day).

Romania 
In Romania, it is considered to be fair to copy text from newspapers for press review purposes provided that the text copied must be under 500 symbols and it must be less than half of the source newspaper article.
Also, the source must be mentioned.

This restriction was requested by the Romanian Press Club (RPC) which represent many but not all the media outlets in the country, and although it is widely used, it is not legally binding.

Notes 

News media